The 1969 USAC Championship Car season consisted of 24 races, beginning in Avondale, Arizona on March 30 and concluding in Riverside, California on December 7.  The USAC National Champion and Indianapolis 500 winner was Mario Andretti.

Schedule and results

In the IZOD IndyCar Series 2011 Historical Record Book the winner of the Rex Mays Classic was declared to be only Art Pollard, because Greg Weld vacated the car on lap 2 of 150.

 Pollard relieved Greg Weld on lap 2 of 150.
 No pole is awarded for the Pikes Peak Hill Climb, in this schedule on the pole is the driver who started first. No lap led was awarded for the Pikes Peak Hill Climb, however, a lap was awarded to the drivers that completed the climb.
 Run in two heats of 100 miles (160 kilometers) each.
 Run in two heats of 96.3 miles (155 kilometers) each.
 Run in two heats of 99 miles (159 kilometers) each.

Final points standings

Note 1: Sam Posey, Mark Donohue, Swede Savage, Peter Revson, John Cannon, Jerry Hansen, David Hobbs, Jack Brabham, Denis Hulme and LeeRoy Yarbrough are not eligible for points.
Note 2: Art Pollard qualified fifth for the Milwaukee event and was eliminated in a 10-car accident at the start of the race. His original car was scored in 15th. Pollard then took over the car of Greg Weld and went on to win the race. Weld gets credit for a start but has no finishing position.

References
 
 
 http://media.indycar.com/pdf/2011/IICS_2011_Historical_Record_Book_INT6.pdf  (p. 238-243)

See also
 1969 Indianapolis 500

USAC Championship Car season
USAC Championship Car
1969 in American motorsport